"What If" is a song by Swedish singer Darin featuring Friends. The song was released as the fourth single from Darin's fourth studio album, Flashback as a bonus track. The song is an anti-bullying song, written by David Jassy and produced by the Swedish producers Twin.

Music video
A music video was shot to accompany the song, featuring Darin. It also displayed victims of bullying in various contexts, most notably participating in sports and social activities.

Charts

References

2009 singles
2008 songs
Songs about bullying
Songs written by Niclas Molinder
Songs written by Joacim Persson
Songs written by David Jassy
Songs written by Johan Alkenäs
Song recordings produced by Twin (production team)